Abraham H. Miller (March 13, 18511913) was a businessman, pastor and state legislator in Arkansas. He served in the Arkansas House of Representatives in 1874 and 1875.

He was a pastor at Centennial Baptist Church in Helena, Arkansas. He wrote an autobiography titled How I Succeeded in my Business.

See also
African-American officeholders during and following the Reconstruction era

References

1913 deaths
Members of the Arkansas House of Representatives
19th-century American politicians
Baptist ministers from the United States
1851 births